Epiphany Cathedral may refer to:

Dominican Republic
Episcopal Cathedral of the Epiphany (Santo Domingo)

Russia
Yelokhovo Cathedral, Moscow

United States
Epiphany Cathedral (Venice, Florida)
Cathedral of the Epiphany (Sioux City, Iowa)